Ninfa may refer to:

 Garden of Ninfa, a landscape garden in central Italy
 Santa Ninfa, a town and comune in Sicily, southern Italy
 Punta Ninfas in Chubut Province, Patagonia, Argentina
 Ninfa, a 12th-13th centuries town in Italy, near Norba
 Ninfa, a 3rd century Christian saint and patron of Palermo; see Tryphon, Respicius, and Nympha
 Santa Ninfa dei Crociferi, a Baroque-Mannerist church of Palermo
 Ninfa plebea, a 1996 Italian comedy-drama film directed by Lina Wertmüller
 La fida ninfa, an opera by Antonio Vivaldi to a libretto by Scipione Maffei

People 
 Ninfa Baronio (1874-1969) was an Italian-American anarcha-feminist activist
 Ninfa Laurenzo, (May 11, 1924 – June 17, 2001), a restaurateur from Houston, Texas who founded the restaurant Ninfa's
 Ninfa Marra (born 3 July 1974), a Venezuelan former professional tennis player.
 Ninfa Salinas Sada (born May 1, 1980), a Mexican politician, and former Mexican Senator
 Ninfa Segarra (born June 4, 1950) is the last President of the New York City Board of Education

See also 
 Nympha (disambiguation)